Xanthaciura mallochi is a species of tephritid or fruit flies in the genus Xanthaciura of the family Tephritidae.

Distribution
Costa Rica, Panama, Colombia, Ecuador, Peru, Argentina, Brazil.

References

Tephritinae
Insects described in 1950
Diptera of South America